Arve Elvebakk (born 1951) is a Norwegian mycologist and professor working from the Arctic University of Norway in Tromsø  who has published widely on Arctic biology,  and climatology. Additionally, he collaborates with many mycologists across the world, and has published names for lichens in Australia, New Zealand, the South Pacific, and South America, and the Antarctic.

Some published names
Gibbosporina
Gibbosporina acuminata
Gibbosporina elixii
Pannaria phyllidiata
See also Taxa named by Arve Elvebakk.

Selected works 
See opposite:.

Books

Journal articles

References
 

1951 births
Living people
20th-century Norwegian scientists
Norwegian mycologists
Academic staff of the University of Tromsø
21st-century Norwegian scientists